Gabe Lopez is an American pop-rock singer/songwriter and producer.  He is of Mexican and Irish descent.  Signed to Universal Music Group as a songwriter and to Spectra Music Group as an artist, Lopez has produced and written for Belinda Carlisle, New Kids on the Block, James Brown, The Go-Go's, RuPaul's Drag Race, Twice, Krayzie Bone, Shinee, Super Junior, Tae Yang, Charice as well as for TV and film.

Career

As an artist 
Known in Los Angeles for performing in noted venues such as The Roxy Theatre, House of Blues, and The Derby and voted one of Music Connection Magazine's Hot 100 Artists, Lopez first came to international prominence as a producer and songwriter for American Idols Jim Verraros and Angela Peel, as well as for international RaggaHop star Ms. Triniti. (References: ASCAP, www.theroxyonsunset.com)

Lopez released his debut This Is About You on January 16, 2006 to strong reviews. All 17 of the album's songs were licensed to TV and movies. NBC used "Sunday Summertime" for the end-of-day montage of winners in the 2008 Olympics. (References: ASCAP, www.ascap.com, TV Guide)

Lopez' second album Shine Like the Sun was released on July 21, 2011. The album's first single "Boomerang" was released on April 11, 2011 and received strong radio-play on Sirius XM Radio, including play on the #1 dance channel - BPM. Shine Like the Sun also features the single "No Hate", an anti-Prop. 8 song that has been used by the NOH8 Campaign. (References: DNA Magazine, www.gabelopez.com)

On March 17, 2012, Lopez released his debut video for the single "If You Could Stop Time", a song featured on Shine Like the Sun. The video has received favorable reviews for its warmth and honesty. (References: myfizzypop.blogspot.com, www.youtube.com)

On December 12, 2012 (12-12-12), Lopez released "Red Light", a brand new single with an upbeat pop-rock vibe. On December 21, 2012 (12-21-12), Lopez released "Red Light (Ultra Red Velvet Remix)", a remix suitable for the dancefloor. (References: www.reverbnation.com, www.gabelopez.com)  The song is currently getting airplay on Sirius XM Radio, iHeart Radio and FM channels. (Source: www.iheart.com, www.siriusxm.com)

In May 2014, Lopez was the opening act for Belinda Carlisle on Carlisle's UK tour. Lopez received favorable reviews in UK publications and in social media. (References: www.siriusxm.com, www.billboard.com)

On June 9, 2014, Lopez released his third album It's Obvious It's Obvious, which debuted on the Top 100 New Releases on iTunes and Top 3 on ReverbNation. (Source: www.itunes.com, www.reverbnation.com) The singles "Hush Your Mind", "Cuz U Like Boys", "Butch Cassidy" and "Red Light" were all played on Sirius XM Radio, iHeart Radio and FM radio in the US and UK.

On August 15, 2015, Lopez released the song "California Blues", which features backing vocals by pop singer Belinda Carlisle. The song received positive reviews from goodmomusic.net, muzoic.com, and popularity.com. The following week, Lopez resumed his role as opener for Carlisle on tour dates in the US and Canada, with dates scheduled in the UK in October 2015.

On October 1, 2017, Lopez again appeared as the opening act for Carlisle on her UK tour. To coincide with the tour, on September 29, 2017, Lopez released the single "Lasso", followed by the music video release on October 13, 2017.

On January 15, 2018, Lopez released the album Roadshow: Out in the U.K., including performances taken from the October 2017 UK tour. The album contains Lopez' original music as well as covers of "Landslide" by Stevie Nicks, "Rocket Man" by Elton John and "Pride (In the Name of Love)" by U2.

In 2018, Lopez signed as an artist to Spectra Music Group. His album God Bless the Queens was released on November 9, 2018 and debuted in the top 150 albums on iTunes (source: www.applemusic.com).  The lead single "Lasso" was promoted to radio and a music video was re-released, followed by the single “Vivian & Valerie,” which also produced a music video.

As a producer and songwriter 
After signing with Rondor (Universal Music Group) in 2008, Lopez continued producing and writing for various artists and acts. Credits include Belinda Carlisle, New Kids on the Block, the Go-Go's, RuPaul's Drag Race, Joey McIntyre, Charice, Drew Ryan Scott, Thomas Fiss, Varsity Fanclub, Shinee (Gold in South Korea), Tyler Hilton, Tae Yang (platinum), Super Junior (multi-platinum), VERIVERY, DreamNote, The Other Two on Comedy Central, Jeff Silbar, Brent Paschke and other recording artists. (Reference: Billboard)

Lopez produced and co-wrote the upcoming Belinda Carlisle single "Sun" with Carlisle and Go-Go's member Jane Wiedlin. Carlisle, Wiedlin and Lopez all sing background harmonies. Lopez also produced the song, with additional production and mixing by Ian Masterson. "Sun" was released on Universal Records on March 19, 2013 and was featured on Carlisle's greatest hits album Icon. (Reference: Billboard)

Lopez co-wrote and produced three songs on the NKOTB album 10 – "Now or Never", "Back to Life" and "Block Party". The album was released April 2, 2013. (www.nkotb.com)

Lopez co-wrote and produced "Still Sounds Good" on the NKOTB album Thankful, which was released on March 7, 2017. (www.billboard.com)

Lopez produced and co-wrote all of the songs on Wilder Shores by Belinda Carlisle, released on September 29, 2017. (www.billboard.com)

In 2019, Lopez was brought on as a music producer for RuPaul's Drag Race and RuPaul's Drag Race Live In Vegas, which opens January 30, 2020 at The Flamingo in Las Vegas. Lopez also produced music for the TV shows The Other Two (TV series) and Gayme Show.

Lopez produced the vocals on the new song “Club Zero” by The Go-Go's for the new documentary The Go-Go's, which premiered at Sundance in 2020.

Lopez had been writing for James Brown in late 2006 and two songs penned by Lopez were to be on Brown's next album entitled "World Funk Against the Grain" due for a 2007 release. Brown died on Christmas Day, 2006, but said in a press release a month before, "Mr. Lopez gets the funk. Mr. Lopez gives us hope for the future of music." The songs remain unreleased. (Reference: James Brown Music Foundation)

Lopez resides in Los Angeles, CA.

Discography

External links 
 

Living people
Year of birth missing (living people)
American musicians of Mexican descent
Hispanic and Latino American musicians
People from Lompoc, California
Singer-songwriters from California